Cereus phatnospermus, synonym Cereus kroenleinii, is a species of columnar cactus found in Brazil, Bolivia, and Paraguay.

References

phatnospermus
Cacti of South America